Shane McGrath may refer to:

 Shane McGrath (hurler) (born 1984), Irish hurler
 Shane McGrath (footballer, born 1919) (1919–1974), Australian rules footballer for Melbourne
 Shane McGrath (footballer, born 1964), Australian rules footballer for Hawthorn
 Shane McGrath (The Bold and the Beautiful), a fictional character in a soap opera